The Davidwache (David(s) Watch) is a well-known police station in Hamburg, Germany. It is located in the St. Pauli quarter, near Reeperbahn, at the corner of Spielbudenplatz square and Davidstraße. Today, it is the seat of Hamburg Police Department 15. While Davidwache has existed since 1840, the listed brick building was erected by Fritz Schumacher from 1913 to 1914 and opened on 10 December 1914. Sculptor Richard Kuöhl designed the ceramic elements of the station house. In 2004–2005, an extension was added at the back. The building is known from numerous movies and TV series, and it has been called Germany's best-known police station. Paul McCartney and Pete Best once had to spend a night at the Davidwache.

References

Buildings and structures in Hamburg-Mitte
Police stations in Germany
Heritage sites in Hamburg